The 2011 Missouri Valley Conference baseball tournament took place from May 24 through 28. All eight teams met in the double-elimination tournament held at Creighton's TD Ameritrade Park Omaha in Omaha, Nebraska. Creighton won their second tournament championship and earned the conference's automatic bid to the 2011 NCAA Division I baseball tournament.

Seeding and format
The league's eight teams were seeded based on conference winning percentage. They then played a two bracket, double-elimination format tournament, with the winner of each bracket then playing a single elimination final.

Results

Bracket:

Box Scores

All-Tournament Team
The following players were named to the All-Tournament Team.

Most Outstanding Player
Creighton pitcher Jonas Dufek was named Most Outstanding Player.

References

Tournament
Missouri Valley Conference Baseball Tournament
Missouri Valley Conference baseball tournament
Missouri Valley Conference baseball tournament